The 1975 Bandy World Championship was the ninth Bandy World Championship and was contested between four men's bandy playing nations.  The championship was played in Finland from 25 January-2 February 1975. The Soviet Union became champions.

Participants

Premier tour
 25 January
 Norway – Finland 1–2
 Soviet Union – Sweden 1–3
 26 January
 Finland – Sweden 2–3
 Soviet Union – Norway 8–0
 28 January
 Norway – Sweden 0–6
 Soviet Union – Finland 12–4
 29 January
 Soviet Union – Sweden 7–2
 30 January
 Norway – Finland 2–2
 1 February
 Finland – Sweden 3–6
 Soviet Union – Norway 14–2
 2 February
 Norway – Sweden 1–8
 Soviet Union – Finland 5–0

References

1975
1975 in bandy
1975 in Finnish sport
International bandy competitions hosted by Finland
Bandy
Bandy